Lara Arruabarrena and Xenia Knoll were the defending champions, but Arruabarrena chose not to participate this year. Knoll played alongside Anastasiya Komardina, but lost in the quarterfinals to Anna Kalinskaya and Evgeniya Rodina.

Kiki Bertens and Johanna Larsson won the title, defeating Viktorija Golubic and Nina Stojanović in the final, 7–6(7–4), 4–6, [10–7].

Seeds

Draw

Draw

References
 Main Draw

Ladies Championship Gstaad - Doubles
2017 Doubles